Cuchi Machay (possibly from in the Quechua spelling Khuchi Mach'ay or Khuchimach'ay, khuchi pig, mach'ay cave, "pig cave") is an archaeological site with rock paintings in Peru. It is located in the Lima Region, Yauyos Province, Tanta District. Cuchi Machay was declared a National Cultural Heritage of Peru by Resolución Viceministerial No. 011-2013-VMPCIC-MC on February 7, 2013.

Cuchi Machay lies near the lakes Mullucocha and La Escalera.

References

Archaeological sites in Lima Region
Archaeological sites in Peru
Rock art in South America